Jonathan William Scott Hofstedt (born October 23, 1969) is an American actor. Known professionally as Jon Huertas, he is best known for his role as witch hunter Brad Alcerro in Sabrina the Teenage Witch, Sergeant Antonio 'Poke' Espera in HBO's Generation Kill, Joe Negroni in the film Why Do Fools Fall in Love, homicide detective Javier Esposito in Castle and Miguel Rivas in This Is Us.

Early life
Huertas was born in New York City, New York, to a Puerto Rican father and a Caucasian mother.  He was raised by his grandparents. By 10 years of age, he began taking part in school plays, which was his first inspiration to pursue acting.  Huertas graduated John Handley High School in Winchester, VA, in 1987 at the age of 17.  After spending a year attending college, he enlisted in the United States Air Force in 1987 and served for 8 years as an aircraft nuclear/conventional weapons specialist. He participated in Operation Just Cause and Operation Desert Storm.

Career
Huertas's acting career started in 1993 when he played an uncredited part in The Webbers.

In 1998, Huertas portrayed Joe Negroni in the romantic drama Why Do Fools Fall in Love alongside such stars as Halle Berry, Paul Mazursky, and Ben Vereen. In 1999, he appeared in two films: the horror movie Cold Hearts and the action movie Stealth Fighter. In the 2000s, he appeared in many films, but his biggest role was in television in 2008 as Sergeant Espera in HBO's miniseries Generation Kill about the 2003 invasion of Iraq.

From 1998 to 1999, Huertas played the role of Antonio in the television series Moesha. From 1999 to 2000, he played Brad, a witch hunter, in Sabrina, the Teenage Witch. From 2009 to 2016, Huertas starred in the role of Detective Esposito in ABC's police procedural Castle. In 2012, Huertas and his Castle co-star Stana Katic received the award for Performance in a Drama Episode at the 16th Annual PRISM Awards.

Huertas was elected to serve a one-year term, beginning September 25, 2010, as an alternate member of the National Board of Directors and as a member of the Hollywood Division Board of Directors of the Screen Actors Guild.

In June 2011, Huertas made his debut music video single called "Sex Is the Word".

Huertas joined the cast of This Is Us in 2016 and has been a part of the series since its first season. In an interview with Tell-Tale TV, Huertas said he didn't know at first that his character Miguel on This Is Us would be aged, or that he'd wind up married to Mandy Moore's character, Rebecca.

In October 2019, Huertas appeared on The Rookie. He played as Alejandro Mejia/Cesar Ojeda in the episode "The Bet" and he reunites with former co-stars from Castle are Nathan Fillion and Seamus Dever as part of ABC's Cast from the Past Week.

Personal life
Huertas married his long-term girlfriend, Nicole Bordges, in Tulum, Mexico, on May 4, 2014.

Filmography

Film

Television

See also

List of Puerto Ricans

References

External links

Jon Huertas at TV Guide

Living people
American male television actors
United States Air Force personnel of the Gulf War
United States Air Force airmen
Puerto Rican male actors
1969 births
20th-century American male actors
21st-century American male actors